Roosevelt County is a county in the U.S. state of Montana. As of the 2020 census, the population was 10,794. Its county seat is Wolf Point. Roosevelt County was created by the Montana Legislature in 1919 from a portion of Sheridan County. The name honors former president Theodore Roosevelt, who had died earlier that year.

Geography
Three-fourths of the county's land area lies within the Fort Peck Indian Reservation.

Major highways

  U.S. Route 2
  Montana Highway 13
  Montana Highway 16
  Montana Highway 25
  Montana Highway 251

Adjacent counties

 Daniels County – northwest
 Sheridan County – northeast
 Williams County, North Dakota – east
 McKenzie County, North Dakota – southeast
 Richland County – south
 McCone County – southwest
 Valley County - west

National protected areas
 Fort Union Trading Post National Historic Site (part)
 Medicine Lake National Wildlife Refuge (part)

Demographics

2000 census
As of the 2000 United States census, there were 10,620 people, 3,581 households, and 2,614 families in the county. The population density was 4 people per square mile (2/km2). There were 4,044 housing units at an average density of 2 per square mile (1/km2). The racial makeup of the county was 40.93% White, 0.05% Black or African American, 55.75% Native American, 0.43% Asian, 0.05% Pacific Islander, 0.25% from other races, and 2.53% from two or more races. 1.23% of the population were Hispanic or Latino of any race. 12.6% were of Norwegian and 11.5% German ancestry. 94.8% spoke English and 3.4% Dakota as their first language.

There were 3,581 households, out of which 40.50% had children under the age of 18 living with them, 47.20% were married couples living together, 18.90% had a female householder with no husband present, and 27.00% were non-families. 23.60% of all households were made up of individuals, and 10.30% had someone living alone who was 65 years of age or older. The average household size was 2.89 and the average family size was 3.40.

The county population contained 34.60% under the age of 18, 7.90% from 18 to 24, 25.80% from 25 to 44, 20.20% from 45 to 64, and 11.60% who were 65 years of age or older. The median age was 32 years. For every 100 females there were 98.30 males. For every 100 females age 18 and over, there were 93.70 males.

The median income for a household in the county was $24,834, and the median income for a family was $27,833. Males had a median income of $25,177 versus $19,728 for females. The per capita income for the county was $11,347. About 27.60% of families and 32.40% of the population were below the poverty line, including 41.60% of those under age 18 and 15.10% of those age 65 or over.

2010 census
As of the 2010 United States census, there were 10,425 people, 3,553 households, and 2,548 families residing in the county. The racial makeup of the county was 60.4% American Indian, 35.8% white, 0.4% Asian, 0.1% black or African American, 0.2% from other races, and 3.0% from two or more races. Those of Hispanic or Latino origin made up 1.3% of the population. In terms of ancestry, 20.0% were Norwegian, 16.3% were German, 6.1% were Irish, and 1.3% were American.

Of the 3,553 households, 42.4% had children under the age of 18 living with them, 42.9% were married couples living together, 20.5% had a female householder with no husband present, 28.3% were non-families, and 24.2% of all households were made up of individuals. The average household size was 2.88 and the average family size was 3.41. The median age was 31.6 years.

The median income for a household in the county was $37,451 and the median income for a family was $50,146. Males had a median income of $39,008 versus $34,725 for females. The per capita income for the county was $17,821. About 15.8% of families and 21.5% of the population were below the poverty line, including 28.6% of those under age 18 and 10.9% of those age 65 or over.

Politics
Roosevelt County is competitive in presidential elections. After a seven-election streak of voting for the Democratic candidate, it voted for Republican Donald Trump by narrow margins in 2016 and 2020.

Communities

Cities
 Poplar
 Wolf Point (county seat)

Towns
 Bainville
 Brockton
 Culbertson
 Froid

Unincorporated communities

 Biem
 Blair
 Bredette
 Chelsea
 Fort Kipp
 Macon
 Sprole

See also
 List of lakes in Roosevelt County, Montana
 List of mountains in Roosevelt County, Montana
 National Register of Historic Places listings in Roosevelt County MT

References

 
Montana counties on the Missouri River
1919 establishments in Montana
Populated places established in 1919